Henri-Albert-Sylvestre Lavorel (5 July 19147 January 1955) was born in Annecy, Haute-Savoie and was married to the English actress Madeleine Carroll from 1946 to 1949. Lavorel died in a car crash in Versailles in 1955 aged 40.

He worked as a producer, writer and director, most notably on The Voyage to America (1951) (writer, producer, director) and C'est arrivé à Paris (1953) (producer, director).

Selected filmography
 The Voyage to America (1951)
 It Happened in Paris (1952)

1914 births
1955 deaths
People from Annecy
French film directors
French male writers
Road incident deaths in France
20th-century French male writers